Toernich is a village of Wallonia and a district of the municipality of Arlon, located in the province of Luxembourg, Belgium. 

It formed a municipality of its own until the fusion of the Belgian municipalities in 1977.

Arlon
Former municipalities of Luxembourg (Belgium)